The 1912 International Cross Country Championships was held in Edinburgh, Scotland, at the Saughton Public Park on 30 March 1912.   A report on the event was given in the Glasgow Herald.

Complete results, medallists, 
 and the results of British athletes were published.

Medallists

Individual Race Results

Men's (10 mi / 16.1 km)

Team Results

Men's

Participation
An unofficial count yields the participation of 44 athletes from 5 countries.

 (9)
 (9)
 (9)
 (9)
 (8)

See also
 1912 in athletics (track and field)

References

International Cross Country Championships
International Cross Country Championships
International Cross Country Championships
International Cross Country Championships
Cross
Cross
Cross country running in the United Kingdom
1910s in Edinburgh